Medieval Scenarios and Recreations, Inc., known simply as MSR, is an educational non-profit Living History organization dedicated to the education, understanding, and appreciation of the Middle Ages. The structure for this activity revolves around the Kingdom of Acre (pronounced AC-R).

Activities
MSR places special emphasis on the fairs and festivals they produce for the public. These events are created with the intention of recreating an experience for guests similar to that found by attendees of an actual medieval fair. Archery, children's games, puppet shows, painting, and activity booths are one type of activity, along with martial demonstrations of live steel medieval swordplay, combat "of peace" with wooden swords, and fencing demonstrations. MSR's fairs have traditionally featured their horse show, with barded heavy war horses and fully armored jousters breaking lances (but not each other).  There are also smaller, more frequent events for members and their guests, which recreate the experience of attending a medieval feast or other activity.

MSR's Kingdom of Acre seeks to replicate aspects of medieval life: the lords and ladies, citizens and subjects of Acre enjoy period music, song and dance, historic research costume design, calligraphy, archery, medieval games, cooking, brewing, and other varied medieval arts and crafts. Members are afforded the opportunity to seek their "roots" through heraldic research and those who have no roots in the crusader period can always make them up.

See also 
 Society for Creative Anachronism
 George A. Romero

References

Further reading

Warfare of the Middle Ages